Windwardside is the second largest town on the island of Saba, aptly named for being on the windward side of the island.

Geography
The hike up the stairs to the top of Mount Scenery can begin from the road just outside Windwardside.

Tourism
Two banks and several dive shops as well as grocery stores, gift shops, etc. are located here. There is also a maritime museum full of Saban history. Windwardside village also has several hotels and inns which serve mostly tourists who come to the island to dive and enjoy the Saban nature. In 1860, the St. Paul's Conversion Church, Saba was built on the grounds of the former quarantine station.

Gallery

See also
Mount Scenery

References

External links

Populated places in Saba